Typepad is a blogging service owned by Endurance International Group, previously owned by SAY Media (from the merger of Six Apart Ltd and VideoEgg). Originally launched in October 2003, Typepad is based on Six Apart's Movable Type platform, and shares technology with Movable Type such as templates and APIs, but is marketed to non-technical users and includes additional features like multiple author support, photo albums and mobile blogging.

The service is available in several languages and countries around the world. In the United States, Typepad was sold at four different paid subscription levels.

Typepad was used by many large organizations and media companies to host their weblogs, such as ABC, MSNBC, the CBC, the BBC and Sky News.

As of the end of 2020, Typepad is no longer accepting new signups. Instead the company refers new users to Bluehost, another web hosting company owned by Endurance International Group.

External links 
 
 Everything Typepad! weblog
 typepad pricing
 BBC Blogs

Blog hosting services
Blog software
Endurance International Group
Internet properties established in 2003